Leolimnophila is a genus of crane flies in the family Limoniidae.

Distribution
Australia.

Species
L. pantherina (Alexander, 1922)
L. tigris Theischinger, 1996

References

Limoniidae
Tipulomorpha genera
Diptera of Australasia